Abasiophilia is a psychosexual attraction to people with impaired mobility, especially those who use orthopaedic appliances such as leg braces, orthopedic casts, or wheelchairs. The term abasiophilia was first used by John Money of the Johns Hopkins University in a paper on paraphilias, in 1990.

In popular culture
Abasiophilia plays a prominent role in the Michael Connelly novel The Scarecrow, in which a serial killer is motivated by abasiophilia.

See also
Attraction to disability
Medical fetishism
Crash (1996 film)
Quid Pro Quo (2008 film)

Footnotes

References

External links

Disability and sexuality
Paraphilias